Salumi (singular salume) are Italian meat products typical of an antipasto, predominantly made from pork and cured. Salumi also include bresaola, which is made from beef, and some cooked products, such as mortadella and prosciutto cotto.

The word salumi, "salted meat," derives from Latin sal, "salt".

Examples of salumi include:
  (Italian: Prosciutto crudo)
 
 
 
 
  / 
 
 
 
 
 
 
 
 
 
 
 
 
 
 , traditionally produced in Felino and other cities in the Parma province, qualifies for Prodotto agroalimentare tradizionale

See also

References

External links

 
Lunch meat
Italian cuisine
Pork
Dried meat
Sausages